Amit (Yitzhak) Segal (born April 10, 1982) is an Israeli journalist, radio and television personality. Serves as the Political commentator of Hevrat HaHadashot (N12 News company) and a political columnist in the "Yediot Aharonot" newspaper. He is regarded as one of the most influential journalists in Israel. Nowadays he acts as the presenter of the Israeli "Meet the press" along Ben Caspit.

Biography 
Segal was born in Haifa and raised in the illegal Israeli settlement Ofra. He is the son of Hagai Segal, an Israeli convicted terrorist and journalist.

Segal is a graduate of the Faculty of Law at the Hebrew University of Jerusalem, and holds a master's degree from University College London (UCL) in public policy. He is a doctoral student in political science at the Hebrew University.

Career 
Segal began his journalistic career at the age of 17 as an education reporter at the "Kol Ha'ir" local newspaper. In 2000, he was accepted into the Israeli Defense Forces Army Radio. At the beginning of his career at the Army Radio, he served as a media reporter and later as a reporter in the Knesset.

In 2006, he moved to the corresponding position at Hevrat HaHadashot in Channel 2 , and presented the program "Couple or Individual" on the Knesset Channel, initially together with Nadav Perry and later together with Barak Ravid and other presenters, until 2016.

In the years 2009–2010 he served as the foreign correspondent of Hevrat HaHadashot in London, after which he returned to the position of Knesset correspondent.

In May 2013 he was appointed the political commentator of the Hevrat HaHadashot instead of Rina Mazliah.

Between the years 2011–2018, Segal wrote a weekly column on politics in the "Makor Rishon" newspaper. As of 2018, he is a columnist in "Mosef Shabbat" of "Yediot Ahronoth".

In the years 2015–2019 he presented the program "Dekelsgal" together with the journalist Yaron Dekel. The program was originally broadcast on the Army Radio, and starting in February 2019 on "Kan Reshet B''. In December, with the outbreak of the 2018–2022 Israeli political crisis, Segal withdrew from the program.

From November 16, 2017 Segal serves as a substitute presenter in the program "Shesh im" (Six O'clock with). Previously, he hosted, also as a substitute presenter, the programs "First Edition" and "Good Night Israel". Segal is extremely active on social media, especially Twitter. In 2020, he revealed that he blocked about 4,200 commenters on Twitter, in particular "those who choose to curse, troll or involve parents". Segal has a Telegram channel with over 100,000 followers.

Exposés and investigations 

Among his exposés as a journalist: the Agraksko affair; Parshat Yehiel Hazan ("The Brain Affair"); The publication of recordings from the IDF communications network in which the soldier Udi Goldwasser was heard minutes before his abduction and the complaints against "Labor Party" candidate Uri Sagi.

In 2008, following a request he submitted together with the Freedom of Information Movement against the Knesset, the District Court of Jerusalem ordered the Knesset to publish films from the security cameras, in which Likud MK Yehiel Hazan and Minister Sofa Landaver are seen committing criminal offenses.

In 2012 he published an investigation into the lifestyle of Tourism Minister Stas Misezhnikov, in which security guards testified that the minister used to get drunk almost every night, to be absent from government meetings, including the approval of the Shalit deal, and to compromise his security. The investigation was mentioned in the media as the main reason Misezhnikov was not included in the Yisrael Beiteinu list for the 19th Knesset.

In December 2014 Segal revealed tapes from 2008 in which Shas leader Rabbi Ovadia Yosef was seen harshly attacking party chairman Aryeh Deri. Following the revelation of the recordings, Deri resigned from the Knesset and from the leadership of the party. The disclosure occurred during the election campaign in which former Shas chairman Eli Yishai contested, which was considered a personal contest between him and Deri. Deri returned to the role of chairman after two weeks.

In November 2017 he published an investigation that dealt with then Israel's ambassador to the UN, Danny Danon, which contained evidence that raised suspicions about the appointment of dozens of Likud activists to positions in the Zionist Council in exchange for political support for Danon in the Likud primaries.

In March 2019 Segal published that Iran had hacked into the cell phone of "Blue and White" chairman Benny Gantz and extracted its contents, and that the Shin Bet had informed Gantz about the matter in a secret meeting during the election campaign.

On May 30, 2019 on the eve of the dissolution of the 21st Knesset, Segal revealed that Israeli Labor Party leader Avi Gabai and Tal Russo intended to join the government led by Benjamin Netanyahu. Segal's exposure prevented the progress of the move.

In December 2019 a series he wrote, "Days of Benjamin", dealing with Benjamin Netanyahu, was broadcast.

4 days before the elections to the 23rd Knesset, Segal together with Dafna Liel published a secret recording of Benny Gantz's senior advisor Israel Bacher, in which he said that Gantz does not have the courage to attack Iran and that he is a danger to Israel.

Written work 
In July 2021 Segal began pre-selling his first book, "The Story of Israeli Politics", which was self-published. According to sources in the industry, about ten thousand books were sold in the first forty-eight hours. His book was illustrated by the chief cartoonist of Haaretz newspaper, Amos Biderman.

Recognition 

 In 2007 he was chosen by "Yediot Ahronoth" as one of the ten best television journalists in Israel.
 In 2008 he was chosen by "Time Out Tel Aviv" as one of the 30 most successful people in Israel under the age of 30.
 In 2009 he was chosen by "Makor Rishon" as the most prominent religious media person in Israel.
 In 2012 he was chosen by "nrg Ma'ariv" as the best parliamentary reporter.
 In 2012, he was awarded the Ometz award for discovering irregularities in the activities of several MKs.
 In 2015 he won the DIGIT award for digital journalism in Israel.
 In 2016 he was chosen by the "Vigo" company as the leading journalist on Twitter.
 In 2019–2020 he was chosen by "Globes" as the most influential journalist in Israel.

Personal life 
Segal is married to Reut and is the father of two sons and one daughter. He lives in the Katamon neighborhood in Jerusalem. His father is the convicted terrorist and journalist Hagai Segal and his brother is the journalist Arnon Segal.

References 

Alumni of University College London
Hebrew University of Jerusalem Faculty of Law alumni
People from Ofra
People from Jerusalem
Israeli broadcasters
Israeli television personalities
Israeli journalists
1982 births
Living people